Cheiranthera alternifolia, commonly known as finger-flower, is a flowering plant in the family Pittosporaceae. It is a small shrub with deep bluish-purple flowers, yellow stamens and dull green linear shaped leaves. It is found growing in South Australia.

Description
Flowering occurs from October to November.

Taxonomy and naming
The species was first formally described in 1978 by Eleanor Marion Bennett and the description was published in Nuytsia. The specific epithet (alternifolia) is derived from the Latin alternus  meaning "alternate" and -folius meaning "leaved".

Distribution
Finger-flower is a common, endemic species  in southern  locations of  South Australia, from the southern parts of the Eyre Peninsula to the south-east and Kangaroo Island.  It was previously found in Victoria but is now presumed extinct in that State.

References 

Pittosporaceae
Apiales of Australia
Flora of South Australia
Taxa named by Allan Cunningham (botanist)